Mandevilla laxa, commonly known as Chilean jasmine, is an ornamental plant in the genus Mandevilla of family Apocynaceae.

M. laxa is native to southern Ecuador, Peru, Bolivia, and northern Argentina. It grows as a vine and is deciduous in cool climates. It can grow to 6 meters (20 feet) tall. Masses of heavily scented white flowers are produced in the summer. IAs it is not fully hardy and does not survive being frozen, in temperate zones it must be grown with the protection of glass, in an unheated greenhouse or conservatory. with full sunlight. In the United Kingdom it has gained the Royal Horticultural Society’s Award of Garden Merit.

Despite its common name 'Chilean jasmine', the species is not a true jasmine of the genus Jasminum.

References

External links

laxa
Plants described in 1932
Flora of Argentina
Flora of Bolivia
Flora of Ecuador
Flora of Peru
Garden plants of South America